Louisiana Highway 824 (LA 824) is a collection of three state-maintained streets located in the Lincoln Parish town of Dubach that have a total length of .  All three routes were established in the 1955 Louisiana Highway renumbering and are presently unsigned. As of 2017, the routes are currently under agreement to be transferred to local control.



Louisiana Highway 824-1

Louisiana Highway 824-1 (LA 824-1) runs  in a north–south direction along Main Street from LA 151 (Annie Lee Street) to LA 824-2 (Wynn Street).  It is an undivided two-lane highway for its entire length.

Louisiana Highway 824-2

Louisiana Highway 824-2 (LA 824-2) runs  in an east–west direction along Wynn Street from the concurrent US 63/US 167 (McMullen Street) to LA 824-1 (Main Street).  It is an undivided two-lane highway for its entire length.

Louisiana Highway 824-3

Louisiana Highway 824-3 (LA 824-3) runs  in an east–west direction along East Hico Street from the junction of the concurrent US 63/US 167 with LA 151 at McMullen Street to a junction with LA 824-1 (Main Street).  It is an undivided two-lane highway for its entire length.

See also

References

External links

La DOTD State, District, and Parish Maps

0824
Transportation in Lincoln Parish, Louisiana
State highways in the United States shorter than one mile